Growth hormone-releasing peptide 6 (GHRP-6) (developmental code name SKF-110679), also known as growth hormone-releasing hexapeptide, is one of several synthetic met-enkephalin analogues that include unnatural D-amino acids, were developed for their growth hormone-releasing activity and are called growth hormone secretagogues. They lack opioid activity but are potent stimulators of growth hormone (GH) release. These secretagogues are distinct from growth hormone releasing hormone (GHRH) in that they share no sequence relation and derive their function through activation of a completely different receptor. This receptor was originally called the growth hormone secretagogue receptor (GHSR), but due to subsequent discoveries, the hormone ghrelin is now considered the receptor's natural endogenous ligand, and it has been renamed as the ghrelin receptor. Therefore, these GHSR agonists act as synthetic ghrelin mimetics.

It has been discovered that when GHRP-6 and insulin are administered simultaneously, GH response to GHRP-6 is increased (1). However, the consumption of carbohydrates and/or dietary fats, around the administration window of GH secretagogues significantly blunts the GH release. A recent study in normal mice showed significant differences in body composition, muscle growth, glucose metabolism, memory and cardiac function in the mice being administered the GHRP-6 (2). There are still many questions regarding this fairly new compound.

See also
 List of growth hormone secretagogues

References

Koh, B., & Hardie, M. (2013). We need an advocate against ASADA's power in doping control. Retrieved from https://theconversation.edu.au/we-need-an-advocate-against-asadas-power-in-doping-control-12119

Ghrelin receptor agonists
Growth hormone secretagogues
Hexapeptides
World Anti-Doping Agency prohibited substances